Casing the Promised Land is a novel written by the American novelist Caleb Carr. Published by Harper & Row in 1980, it was Carr's first published book (he had already published several non-fiction newspaper and magazine pieces). Acknowledging the amateur nature of the work, in 1999, Caleb Carr posted the following notice on Amazon.com: "I am the author of this book. It has a few good scenes, but is essentially "roman à clef" nonsense that every writer has to get out of his system early on. Do yourself a favor and read ANYTHING else I've written (you'll be doing me a favor, too). Forgive the follies of youth."

External links
 Amazon.com page

Novels by Caleb Carr
1980 American novels
Roman à clef novels
Harper & Row books
1980 debut novels